Kristine Bjørdal Leine (born 6 August 1996) is a Norwegian professional footballer who plays as a centre back for Rosenborg and the Norway national team.

Career

Club
Leine started her career in Fortuna Ålesund, playing senior football from the age of 15 and joining first-tier Røa at the age of 19.

On 20 July 2019, Reading announced the signing of Leine.

Career statistics

Club 
As of 19 May 2021.

International 
As of 16 July 2021.

Honours

International 
Algarve Cup: 2019

References

External links
 

1996 births
Living people
Norwegian women's footballers
Women's association football defenders
Norway women's youth international footballers
Norway women's international footballers
Røa IL players
Toppserien players
Reading F.C. Women players
FA Women's National League players
Rosenborg BK Kvinner players
Norwegian expatriate women's footballers
Expatriate women's footballers in England
Norwegian expatriate sportspeople in England
UEFA Women's Euro 2017 players